Shutov is a Russian masculine surname, its feminine counterpart is Shutova. It may refer to

Lyubov Shutova (born 1983), Russian fencer
Oleksandr Shutov (born 1975), Ukrainian football player
Sergei Shutov (born 1955), Russian artist 
The Shutov Assembly, an album by British musician Brian Eno dedicated to Sergei Shutov
Stepan Shutov (1902–1963), Soviet military officer
Vladimir Shutov (born 1971), Russian football player
Yury Shutov (1946–2014), Russian politician 

Russian-language surnames